Gammarus is an amphipod crustacean genus in the family Gammaridae. It contains more than 200 described species, making it one of the most species-rich genera of crustaceans. Different species have different optimal conditions, particularly in terms of salinity, and different tolerances; Gammarus pulex, for instance, is a purely freshwater species, while Gammarus locusta is estuarine, only living where the salinity is greater than 25‰.

Species of Gammarus are the typical "scuds" of North America and range widely throughout the Holarctic. A considerable number are also found southwards into the Northern Hemisphere tropics, particularly in Southeast Asia.

Species
The following species are included: Four new species were found in 2018 on the Tibetan Plateau. Four more new species were described from the Chihuahuan Desert in 2021.

Gammarus abscisus G. Karaman, 1973
Gammarus abstrusus Hou, Platvoet & Li, 2006
Gammarus acalceolatus Pinkster, 1970
Gammarus accolae G. Karaman, 1973
Gammarus accretus Hou & Li, 2002
Gammarus acherondytes Hubricht & Mackins, 1940
Gammarus aequicauda (Martynov, 1931)
Gammarus agrarius G. Karaman, 1973
Gammarus albimanus G. Karaman, 1968
Gammarus alsaticus Van Straelen, 1924†
Gammarus altus Hou & Li, 2018
Gammarus anatoliensis Schellenberg, 1937
Gammarus angulatus (Martynov, 1930)
Gammarus angusticoxalis Martynov, 1935
Gammarus annandalei (Monod, 1924)
Gammarus annulatus Smith, 1873
Gammarus anodon Stock, Mirzajani, Vonk, Naderi & Kiabi, 1998
Gammarus aoculus Hou & Li, 2003
Gammarus araxenius Derzhavin, 1938
Gammarus arduus G. Karaman, 1975
Gammarus argaeus Vávra, 1905
Gammarus bakhteyaricus Khalayi-Pirbalanty & Sari, 2004
Gammarus balcanicus Schaferna, 1922
Gammarus barnaulensis Schellenberg, 1937
Gammarus baysali Özbek et al., 2013
Gammarus belli G. Karaman, 1984
Gammarus bergi Martynov, 1930
Gammarus birsteini Karaman & Pinkster, 1977
Gammarus bosniacus Schäferna, 1922
Gammarus bousfieldi Cole & Minckley, 1961
Gammarus brevicornis (Martynov, 1935)
Gammarus brevipodus Hou, Li & Platvoet, 2004
Gammarus breviramus Bousfield & Elwood, 1971
Gammarus bucharensis Martynov, 1935
Gammarus caparti Petre-Stroobants, 1981
Gammarus caucasicus Martynov, 1932
Gammarus caudisetus Viviani, 1805
Gammarus chaohuensis Hou & Li, 2002
Gammarus chevreuxi Sexton, 1913
Gammarus chimkenti G. Karaman, 1984
Gammarus chostensis Martynov, 1932
Gammarus cohabitus Hosinger, Shafer, Fong & Culver, 2008
Gammarus colei sp. nov. 
Gammarus comosus Hou, Li & Gao, 2005
Gammarus craspedotrichus Hou & Li, 2002
Gammarus crenulatus G. S. Karaman & Pinkster, 1977
Gammarus crinicaudatus Stock, Mirzajani, Vonk, Naderi & Kiabi, 1998
Gammarus crinicornis Stock, 1966
Gammarus crispus Martynov, 1932
Gammarus curvativus Hou & Li, 2003
Gammarus dabanus Tachteew & Mekhanikova, 2000
Gammarus daiberi Bousfield, 1969
Gammarus decorosus Meng, Hou & Li, 2003
Gammarus denticulatus Hou, Li & Morino, 2002
Gammarus desperatus Cole, 1981
Gammarus dorsosetosus Mateus & Mateus, 1990
Gammarus duebeni Liljeborg, 1852
Gammarus dulensis S. Karaman, 1929
Gammarus edwardsi Bate, 1862
Gammarus effultus G. Karaman, 1975
Gammarus electrus Hou & Li, 2003
Gammarus elevatus Hou, Li & Morino, 2002
Gammarus elvirae Iannilli & Ruffo, 2002
Gammarus emeiensis Hou, Li & Koenemann, 2002
Gammarus fasciatus Say, 1818
Gammarus finmarchicus Dahl, 1938
Gammarus flabellifera Stimpson, 1856
Gammarus fluviatilis Milne-Edwards, 1840†
Gammarus fontinalis Costa, 1883
Gammarus fossarum Koch, 1836
Gammarus frater Karaman & Pinkster, 1977
Gammarus frigidus Hou & Li, 2004
Gammarus galgosensis Lee & Kim, 2004
Gammarus galgosensis Lee & Kim, 1980
Gammarus gauthieri (S. Karaman, 1935)
Gammarus glabratus Hou & Li, 2003
Gammarus goedmakersae G. S. Karaman & Pinkster, 1977
Gammarus gonggaensis Hou & Li, 2018
Gammarus gracilis Martynov, 1935
Gammarus gregoryi Tattersall, 1924
Gammarus halilicae G. Karaman, 1969
Gammarus hegmatanensis Hekmatara, Sari & Baladehi, 2011
Gammarus hirsutus Martynov, 1935
Gammarus hongyuanensis Barnard & Dai, 1988
Gammarus hoonsooi Lee, 1986
Gammarus hyalelloides Cole, 1976
Gammarus ibericus Margalef, 1951
Gammarus inaequicauda Stock, 1966
Gammarus inberbus Karaman & Pinkster, 1977
Gammarus inopinatus Mateus & Mateus, 1990
Gammarus insensibilis Stock, 1966
Gammarus italicus Goedmakers & Pinkster, 1977
Gammarus izmirensis Özbek, 2007
Gammarus jacksoni Morino & Whitman, 1995
Gammarus jaspidus Hou & Li, 2004
Gammarus jenneri Bynum & Fox, 1977
Gammarus kamtschaticus Tzvetkova, 1972
Gammarus kangdingensis Hou & Li, 2018
Gammarus kasymovi Aliev, 1997
Gammarus katagani Özbek, 2012
Gammarus kesanensis Özbek & Camur-Elipek, 2010
Gammarus kesslerianus Martynov, 1931
Gammarus kischineffensis Schellenberg, 1937
Gammarus komareki (Schaferna, 1922)
Gammarus korbuensis Martynov, 1930
Gammarus koshovi Bazikalova, 1946
Gammarus kyonggiensis Lee & Seo, 1990
Gammarus laborifer Karaman & Pinkster, 1977
Gammarus lacustris G. O. Sars, 1864
Gammarus langi sp. nov. 
Gammarus lasaensis Barnard & Dai, 1988
Gammarus laticoxalis Karaman & Pinkster, 1977
Gammarus lawrencianus Bousfield, 1956
Gammarus lecroyae Thoma & Heard, 2009
Gammarus ledoyeri G. Karaman, 1987
Gammarus lepoliensis Jazdzewski & Konopacka, 1989
Gammarus lichuanensis Hou & Li, 2002
Gammarus limnaeus S. I. smith, 1874
Gammarus limosus Hou & Li, 2018
Gammarus lobifer Stock, Mirzajani, Vonk, Naderi & Kiabi, 1998
Gammarus locusta (Linnaeus, 1758)
Gammarus longipedis Karaman & Pinkster, 1987
Gammarus longisaeta Lee & Seo, 1992
Gammarus lophacanthus Hou & Li, 2002
Gammarus lordeganensis Khalayi-Pirbalanty & Sari, 2004
Gammarus lychnidensis Schellenberg, 1943
Gammarus macedonicus G. Karaman, 1976
Gammarus madidus Hou & Li, 2005
Gammarus malpaisensis sp. nov. 
Gammarus marmouchensis Fadil, 2006
Gammarus maroccanus Fadil & Dakki, 2001
Gammarus martensi Hou & Li, 2004
Gammarus matienus Derzhavin, 1938
Gammarus miae Mateus & Mateus, 1990
Gammarus microps Pinkster & Goedmakers, 1975
Gammarus minus Say, 1818
Gammarus mladeni Karaman & Pinkster, 1977
Gammarus monospeliensis Pinkster, 1972
Gammarus montanus Hou, Li & Platvoet, 2004
Gammarus mucronatus Say, 1818
Gammarus murarius Hou & Li, 2004
Gammarus nekkensis Uchida, 1935
Gammarus ninglangensis Hou & Li, 2003
Gammarus nipponensis Uéno, 1940
Gammarus nox Stock, 1995
Gammarus nudus Martynov, 1931
Gammarus obnixus Karaman & Pinkster, 1977
Gammarus obruki Özbek, 2012
Gammarus oceanicus Segerstråle, 1947
Gammarus ocellatus Martynov, 1930
Gammarus ochridensis (Schäferna, 1926)
Gammarus odaensis Lee & Kim, 1980
Gammarus odettae Mateus & Mateus, 1990
Gammarus oeningensis Heer, 1865†
Gammarus orinos Pinkster & Schol, 1984
Gammarus oronticus Alouf, 1979
Gammarus osellai Karaman & Pinkster, 1977
Gammarus pageti Mateus & Mateus, 1990
Gammarus palustris Bousfield, 1969
Gammarus parechiniformis G. Karaman, 1977
Gammarus paricrenatus Stock, Mirzajani, Vonk, Naderi & Kiabi, 1998
Gammarus parthicus Stock, Mirzajani, Vonk, Naderi & Kiabi, 1998
Gammarus paucispinus Hou & Li, 2002
Gammarus pavlovici
Gammarus pavo Karaman & Pinkster, 1977
Gammarus paynei Delong, 1992
Gammarus pecos Cole & Bousfield, 1970
Gammarus pellucidus Gurjanova, 1930
Gammarus percalacustris sp. nov. 
Gammarus pexus Hou & Li, 2005
Gammarus platvoeti Hou & Li, 2003
Gammarus pljakici G. Karaman, 1964
Gammarus plumipes Mateus & Mateus, 1990
Gammarus praecyrius Derzhavin, 1941†
Gammarus preciosus Wang, Hou & Li, 2009
Gammarus pretzmanni Mateus & Mateus, 1990
Gammarus proiectus Stock, Mirzajani, Vonk, Naderi & Kiabi, 1998
Gammarus pseudoanatoliensis Karaman & Pinkster, 1987
Gammarus pseudolimnaeus Bousfield, 1958
Gammarus pseudosyriacus Karaman & Pinkster, 1977
Gammarus pulex Linnaeus, 1758
Gammarus qiani Hou & Li, 2002
Gammarus rambouseki S. Karaman, 1931
Gammarus retzi Maikovsky, 1941†
Gammarus rifatlensis Fadil, 2006
Gammarus riparius Hou & Li, 2002
Gammarus roeselii Gervais, 1835
Gammarus rouxi Pinkster & Goedmakers, 1975
Gammarus salemaai G. Karaman, 1985
Gammarus salinus Spooner, 1947
Gammarus sepidannus Zamanpoore, Poeckl, Grabowski & Schiemer, 2009
Gammarus setosus Dementieva, 1931
Gammarus shanxiensis Barnard & Dai, 1988
Gammarus shenmuensis Hou & Li, 2004
Gammarus sichuanensis Hou, Li & Zheng, 2002
Gammarus sinuolatus Hou & Li, 2004
Gammarus sirvannus Hekmatara, Sari & Baladehi, 2011
Gammarus sketi G. Karaman, 1989
Gammarus sobaegensis G. Karaman, 1984
Gammarus solidus G. Karaman, 1977
Gammarus songirdaki G. Karaman, 1984
Gammarus soyoensis Lee & Kim, 1980
Gammarus spelaeus Martynov, 1931
Gammarus spinipalmus (Chen, 1939)
Gammarus spooneri G. Karaman, 1991
Gammarus stagnarius Hou, Li & Morino, 2002
Gammarus stalagmiticus Hou & Li, 2005
Gammarus stankokaramani G. Karaman, 1976
Gammarus stojicevici (S. Karaman, 1929)
Gammarus stupendus Pinkster, 1983
Gammarus subtypicus Stock, 1966
Gammarus suifunensis Martynov, 1925
Gammarus syriacus Chevreux, 1895
Gammarus takesensis Hou, Li & Platvoet, 2004
Gammarus taliensis Shen, 1954
Gammarus tauricus Martynov, 1931
Gammarus teletzkensis Martynov, 1930
Gammarus tigrinus Sexton, 1939
Gammarus topkarai Özbek & Balik, 2009
Gammarus translucidus Hou, Li & Li, 2004
Gammarus troglophilus Hubricht & Mackins, 1940
Gammarus truncatus Martynov, 1930
Gammarus turanus Martynov, 1935
Gammarus uludagi G. S. Karaman, 1975
Gammarus unguiserratus Costa, 1853
Gammarus ustaoglui Özbek & Guloglu, 2005
Gammarus varsoviensis Jazdzewski, 1975
Gammarus vignai Pinkster & Karaman, 1978
Gammarus wangbangensis Lee & Seo, 1990
Gammarus wautieri Roux, 1967
Gammarus wilkitzkii Birula, 1897
Gammarus xiangfengensis Hou & Li, 2002
Gammarus zaddachi Sexton, 1912
Gammarus zagrosensis Zamanpoore, Poeckl, Grabowski & Schiemer, 2009
Gammarus zeongogensis Lee & Kim, 1980

References

 
Gammaridea
Taxonomy articles created by Polbot
Crustacean genera